4-Hydroxyestriol, also known as estra-1,3,5(10)-triene-3,4,16α,17β-tetrol, is an endogenous catechol estrogen and metabolite of estriol. It has been found in pregnancy urine.

See also
 2-Hydroxyestriol

References

Cyclopentanols
Sterols
Phenols
Estranes
Estrogens
Human metabolites